Cayetano Arellano High School, otherwise known as Manila North High School, is a public secondary school located along Teodora Alonzo Street, Santa Cruz, Manila, Philippines. It is one of the oldest public schools in Manila.

History
The first American-established public high school in Manila was Manila High School, which according to the National Historical Institute, was established in 1906 under the tutelage of Dr. David P. Barrows, Director of Education and Mr. Charles H. Magee, Acting Superintendent of the City Schools of Manila.

In 1921, it was split into two: Manila South High School, later renamed Araullo High School and Manila North High School, now known as Arellano High School. The first principals were Americans.

In 1930, Manila North High School was renamed in honor of Justice Cayetano Arellano, the first Filipino Chief Justice of the Supreme Court.

Under the administration of Juan C. Laya (1945–48), the school annexed two units at La Chambre Building on Reina Regente Street in Binondo to accommodate the growing number of post-liberation students. These units later became the Jose Abad Santos High School.
 
During the administration of Angel Framo (1948–49), Arellano High School became the largest public school in Manila.

In 1949, the annexes in Halili and Rizal Avenue became Manuel L Quezon High School. In 1961, the remaining five annexes in Mayhaligue, O'Donnel, Zurbaran, Santander and Lope de Vega were integrated to become Doña Teodora Alonzo High School.

Notable alumni 
Lorenzo Sumulong
Alberto Segismundo Cruz
Alfredo M. Santos
Benedicto Cabrera
Adrian Cristobal
Reynato Puno
Andres Narvasa
Edilberto de Jesus
Jaime C. Laya
Fernando Poe Sr.
German Moreno
Renato Constantino
Fernando Sena

Gallery

References

External links
Arellano (Manila North) High School Across Time

High schools in Manila
High schools in Metro Manila
Education in Santa Cruz, Manila
Public schools in the Philippines
1921 establishments in the Philippines